Dekiling Gewog (Dzongkha: བདེ་སྐྱིད་གླིང་) is a gewog (village block) of Sarpang District, Bhutan.

References

Gewogs of Bhutan
Sarpang District